Justin Pierre Greaves (born 26 February 1994) is a Barbadian cricketer who has played for both Barbados and the Combined Campuses and Colleges in West Indian domestic cricket. He made his international debut for the West Indies cricket team in January 2022.

Career
Greaves played for the West Indies under-19s at the 2012 Under-19 World Cup in Australia. In an earlier under-19 series, against Sri Lanka, he had top-scored in a match from seventh in the batting order, making 90 runs off only 68 balls.

Greaves played for Sefton Park CC in the Liverpool and District Cricket Competition in England in 2013, scoring 109 and taking 4–32 on debut against Old Xaverians  and finishing with 742 runs at 67.45 and 31 wickets at 15.00 in 18 league games as Sefton convincingly won the second division.  He returned to England in 2014, assisting Essex side Frinton-on-Sea to a second-placed finish in the Two Counties league to gain promotion to the East Anglian Premier Cricket League.

Greaves made his first-class debut during the 2013–14 Regional Four Day Competition, representing the Combined Campuses. His debut for Barbados came in January 2016, when he played against ICC Americas in the 2015–16 Regional Super50.

In June 2018, he was named in the Cricket West Indies B Team squad for the inaugural edition of the Global T20 Canada tournament. He made his Twenty20 debut on 20 September 2019, for the Barbados Tridents, in the 2019 Caribbean Premier League. The following month, he was named in the West Indies Emerging Team for the 2019–20 Regional Super50 tournament.

In July 2020, he was named in the Barbados Tridents squad for the 2020 Caribbean Premier League.

In November 2021, Greaves was named in the West Indies' One Day International (ODI) squad for their series against Pakistan. In December 2021, he was named in the West Indies' ODI squad for their series against Ireland. He made his ODI debut on 8 January 2022, for the West Indies against Ireland.

References

External links
Player profile and statistics at CricketArchive
Player profile and statistics at ESPNcricinfo

1994 births
Living people
West Indies One Day International cricketers
Barbadian cricketers
Barbados cricketers
Barbados Royals cricketers
Combined Campuses and Colleges cricketers
West Indies Emerging Team cricketers